IA3 or similar may refer to:
 Ice Age: Dawn of the Dinosaurs, a 2009 3-D computer animated adventure comedy film
 Iowa Highway 3, a state highway that runs from east to west across the state of Iowa
 Iowa's 3rd congressional district, a congressional district in the U.S. state of Iowa